Marvin Lawrence Winans (born March 5, 1958) is an American pastor and gospel singer, and a member of the musical Winans family. He is also known for his recurring role in the hit show Tyler Perry's House of Payne.

Life and career

Early life
Winans was born in Detroit, Michigan, the fourth of 10 children of Delores (née Ransom) and David Glenn Winans Sr., who recorded together as "Mom and Pop Winans". His siblings David II, Carvin (his fraternal twin), Benjamin (BeBe), Daniel, Michael, Ronald, Priscilla (CeCe), Deborah (Debbie), Angelique (Angie) also have careers in the music industry singing, writing and producing.

Musical career
Winans sang in the 1970s with his brothers Ronald, Carvin (his twin) and Michael (the group also included others) as The Testimonial Singers.  Their first performance was at a high school talent show.  In 1975 the group's name was changed to The Winans.  Their musical careers spanned both the 1980s and 1990s.  The Winans, who were discovered by Andrae Crouch, released their first album under the new group's name, entitled Introducing The Winans, in 1981. The Winans were greatly influenced by Albertina Walker and her group The Caravans.  An organist and pianist, Marvin also wrote songs, and produced for The Winans records, for solo projects from family members, and on other gospel releases. For his vocals on the 1985 song "Bring Back the Days of Yea and Nay", Winans was awarded a Grammy for Best Male Soul Gospel Performance. He and several of his siblings and family members sang The Winans' hit "Tomorrow" at Whitney Houston's funeral.

In 2007, Winans released his first solo recording, Alone, But Not Alone.

On June 26, 2012 Winans released "Marvin L Winans Presents The Praise and Worship Experience" on his own label, MLW Productions Inc. The album features: Doen Moen, Marvin Sapp, Donnie McClurkin, Mary Mary, Mom Winans, Roderick Dixon, Bishop Paul Morton amongst others and was recorded at Winans' church in Detroit, Mi.

Pastor
Winans is a pastor, and has a school, the Marvin L. Winans Academy of Performing Arts, referred to by staff and students as "WAPA", which he founded in 1997. He founded The Perfecting Church in Detroit, Michigan in 1989, and released an album featuring the church's choir in 1992 entitled Introducing Perfected Praise. A second album, Friends, appeared in 2001. His 2007 release, Alone but Not Alone, was nominated for a Grammy award for Best Contemporary R&B Gospel Album. On Saturday, February 18, 2012, at noon (EST), Winans preached the eulogy at Whitney Houston's funeral, at New Hope Baptist Church in Newark, New Jersey. His fourth album entitled Marvin L. Winans presents The Praise + Worship Experience was released in 2012 recorded at his church-Perfecting Church through MLW Productions

Personal life 
Marvin was formerly married to gospel singer Viviane "Vickie" Winans (née Bowman) for 16 years, until their divorce in 1995. His sons, Marvin Jr. (Coconut), Josiah Winans, and stepson Mario "Skeeter" Winans are also in the music business.  Mario is a producer and R&B singer. Marvin Jr., once a member of Winans Phase 2, is now a solo artist and is also a producer, and Josiah Winans is also a producer featured on Marvin Jr.'s first solo project.  Marvin Winans married Deneen Carter on April 22, 2022.

Discography

References

External links

1958 births
20th-century African-American male singers
American male singers
American gospel singers
Living people
African-American Christians
African-American religious leaders
American twins
Singers from Detroit
Winans family
21st-century African-American people